Heydarali (also Romanized as Heydarʿalī) is a village in Tarhan-e Gharbi Rural District, Tarhan District, Kuhdasht County, Lorestan Province, Iran. At the 2006 census, its population was 321, in 63 families.

References 

Towns and villages in Kuhdasht County